Sir Thomas Mostyn, 4th Baronet  (26 April 1704 – 1758), of Mostyn, Flintshire, was a British landowner and Tory politician who sat in the House of Commons between 1734 and 1758.

Early life

Mostyn was the eldest son of Sir Roger Mostyn, 3rd Baronet, of Mostyn and Leighton, and his  wife Essex Finch daughter of Daniel Finch, 2nd Earl of Nottingham.  He was educated at  Westminster School in 1716 and  matriculated at Christ Church, Oxford on 13 October 1720, aged 16.  He travelled extensively in Europe from   October 1723 until May 1728. His main interest was literature and he collected books and manuscripts.  He married Sarah Western, daughter. of Robert Western of St Peters Cornhill, London and Rivenhall Essex in about 1733.

Career
Mostyn was a Hanoverian Tory, and in 1727 forced the Jacobite sheriff of Flintshire to proclaim George II.  He took a leading part in local Tory preparations for the  1734 British general election  and was returned as Member of Parliament for Flintshire in succession to his father. He voted  consistently  against the Administration. He succeeded his father to the baronetcy on  8 May 1739. At the 1741 British general election he stood down by agreement, and declined ithe invitation to stand for Flint Boroughs  after the heavy cost of the previous election there, which had cost him over £2,000. At the 1747 British general election, he was returned for Flintshire  He was returned unopposed again for Flintshire at the   1754 British general election.

Death and legacy
Mostyn died on 24 March 1758 leaving four sons and five daughters. His wife Sarah survived to 1783. He was succeeded in the baronetcy by his son Roger.  His daughter  Anne, became the second wife of Thomas Pennant, the naturalist and traveller in 1777.

References

1704 births
1758 deaths
British MPs 1734–1741
British MPs 1747–1754
British MPs 1754–1761
Members of the Parliament of Great Britain for English constituencies
Baronets in the Baronetage of England